The Carmichael Chair of Ancient Indian History and Culture is a history professorship in the University of Calcutta, India; its holder is known as Carmichael Professor. The post was created by Ashutosh Mukherjee in 1912 after Baron Carmichael the then Governor of Bengal. The German Indologist George Thibaut was the first to be appointed a Carmichael Professor.

List of Carmichael Professors

References

1912 establishments in India
Ancient Indian History and Culture, Carmichael
Academic staff of the University of Calcutta